Vermont/Athens station is a below-grade light rail station on the C Line of the Los Angeles Metro Rail system. It is located in the median of Interstate 105 (Century Freeway), below Vermont Avenue, after which the station is named along with the Athens community where it is located.

The original name for the station was Vermont Ave/I-105, but was later simplified and its location in Athens clarified, with a change to Vermont/Athens.

This station is expected to be a stop along the Vermont Transit Corridor when that service commences.

Service

Station layout

Hours and frequency

Connections 
, the following connections are available:
 GTrans (Gardena): 2
 the Link: Athens

History
The site is approximately the former Delta station on the San Pedro via Gardena Line of the Pacific Electric. It was also the southern terminus of the Los Angeles Railway F Line, allowing interchanges between the two systems. Pacific Electric service ended in 1940, while the F Line ran until 1955.

References 

C Line (Los Angeles Metro) stations
Railway stations in the United States opened in 1995
1995 establishments in California